Valasakkadu is a village in Thanjavur district, Tamil Nadu, India. The village is part of the Peravurani legislative assembly constituency and the Thanjavur Parliamentary Constituency.

 
Occupation:
The main occupations of the people in valasakkadu are Farming, which included Paddy farm ,Coconut farm and sugar cane farms.

Temples
Ayyanar Temple
Ganesha Temple
Mariamman Temple
Kathavarayan Temple

References

External links
 http://www.kulguru.com/school/pums-valasaikadu-thuravikkadu-peravurani-thanjavur-tamil-nadu-k6s9ok6i
 http://www.etamilnadu.org/thuravikkadu-village-6584.html
 http://valasakkaduonline.blogspot.com/

Villages in Thanjavur district